Kshisha Park is a recreational park in Al Rahmaniyah suburb, Sharjah, the United Arab Emirates. It was opened in March 2021.

Facilities
Kshisha Park hosts football and volleyball courts, a library, amphitheater, fitness hub, jogging and cycling tracks, playgrounds, skateboard range, and halls for holding workshops. It houses an artificial pond with a duck feeding station.

Gallery

See also 
 Sharjah National Park
 Shees Park
 Jebel Hafeet National Park, Abu Dhabi
 Mangrove National Park, Abu Dhabi

References 

National parks of the United Arab Emirates
Geography of the Emirate of Sharjah
Tourist attractions in the Emirate of Sharjah